Firenze Santa Maria Novella (in English Florence Santa Maria Novella) or Stazione di Santa Maria Novella  is the main railway station in Florence, Italy. The station is used by 59 million people every year and is one of the busiest in Italy.

It is at the northern end of the Florence–Rome high-speed railway line Direttissima, which was completed on 26 May 1992 and the southern end of the Bologna–Florence railway line, opened on 22 April 1934. 
A new high speed line to Bologna opened on 13 December 2009. The station is also used by regional trains on lines connecting to: Pisa, Livorno (Leopolda railway); Lucca, Viareggio (Viareggio–Florence railway); Bologna (Bologna–Florence railway) and Faenza (Faentina railway).

History
The station was inaugurated on 3 February 1848 to serve the railway to Pistoia and Pisa, and was initially called Maria Antonia (from the name of the railway, named in honour of Princess Maria Antonia of the Two Sicilies); it was much closer to the Santa Maria Novella church than the current station. It was renamed after the church after the unification of Italy.

In 1932 through a number of newspaper editorials, published in La Nazione, Florence's main daily, Romano Romanelli a reputed and influential Florentine sculptor, criticized the original project by the Architect Mazzoni for the new Firenze Santa Maria Novella railway station. A constructive debate resulted in the final choice of the project sponsored by the Architect Marcello Piacentini and designed by Gruppo Toscano.

The station was designed in 1932 by a group of architects known as the Gruppo Toscano (Tuscan Group) of which Giovanni Michelucci and  Italo Gamberini, Berardi, Baroni, Lusanna were among the members; the building was constructed between 1932 and 1934.  The plan of the building, as seen from above, looks as if it were based on the fascio littorio, the symbol of Benito Mussolini's National Fascist Party, many documents give this explanation, but, that shape was forced by the pre-existing station. The "blade" represented by the first two-passenger tracks and the postal ones were in fact the extension of the 1861 alignment which included the tracks of the line from Livorno.

The building is a prime example of Italian modernism, but has little to do with the Italian Rationalism movement, being more strongly influenced by the Viennese architecture of Loos and Hoffman, with perhaps a nod to Wright; but it is the building's complete originality that makes it outstanding. The competition to design the station was controversial but the approval by Mussolini of the Gruppo Toscano project was hailed as an official acceptance of modernity.  The station was designed to replace the aging Maria Antonia Station, one of the few example of architecture by I. K. Brunel in Italy, and to serve as a gateway to the city centre.

The Gruppo Toscano was only responsible for the main frontal building of the station. The heating plant, platforms, other facilities and details such as benches and baggage shelves were all designed in a contrasting style by the official Ministry of Communications architect, Angiolo Mazzoni. Outside and adjacent to the station is also Michelucci's white marble Palazzina Reale di Santa Maria Novella, built to host the Royal family on visits to Florence.

While it is of a "uncompromisingly modern" design, the use of pietra forte (a hard sandstone) for the station's stone frontage was intended to respond to and contrast with the nearby Gothic architecture of the church of Santa Maria Novella. The interior of the station features a dramatic metal and glass roof with large skylights over the main passenger concourse, which is aligned perpendicular to the tracks and acts as a pedestrian street. The skylights span the passenger concourse without any supporting columns, giving a feeling of openness and vast space and reinforcing the convergence of all the public functions of the station on the passenger concourse.

Near platform #16 there is a statue and a memorial plaque in remembrance of the train loads of Jewish people who were deported from Italy to Nazi concentration camps during World War II.

Train services
The station is served by the following services:

High speed services (Frecciarossa) Turin – Milan – Bologna – Florence – Rome – Naples – Salerno
High speed services (Frecciarossa) Venice – Padua – Bologna – Florence – Rome – Naples – Salerno
High speed services (Frecciargento) Trieste – Venice – Padua – Bologna – Florence – Rome
High speed services (Frecciargento) Udine – Treviso – Venice – Padua – Bologna – Florence – Rome
High speed services (Frecciargento) Venice – Padua – Bologna – Florence – Rome
High speed services (Frecciargento) Venice – Padua – Bologna – Florence – Rome – Fiumicino Airport

See also

Firenze Campo di Marte railway station
Firenze Rifredi railway station
History of rail transport in Italy
List of railway stations in Tuscany
Rail transport in Italy
Railway stations in Italy

References

External links

Santa Maria Novella Railway Station
Railway stations opened in 1934
Art Deco railway stations
1934 establishments in Italy
Italian fascist architecture
Modernist architecture in Italy
Railway stations in Italy opened in the 20th century